Eqe Bay is an irregularly shaped, uninhabited waterway in Qikiqtaaluk Region, Nunavut, Canada. It is located on the western coast of north-central Baffin Island. An arm of the Foxe Basin, it contains no islands within it, but Bray Island lies outside the mouth of the bay to the south.

Geology
The bay is within the northeastern Rae craton.

References

Bays of Foxe Basin